Darugha (from Mongol: daru-, 'to press, to seal') was a territorial subdivision in the Mongol Empire. A darugha was ruled by a darughachi.

Later, the term was used for the province, particularly in Kazan and the Siberian Khanates in the 15th and 16th centuries. It was used in the Turkic-populated parts of the Russian Empire in the 16th to 18th centuries. In Safavid Iran, it was a title meaning prefect. One of the many Safavid darughas was Mirman Mirimanidze.

In 1762, the Bashkir people controlled the Kazan, Nogai, Osin Darugha and Siberian Darughas.

In the Mughal Empire, a daroga was the title of a district police officer. This title was kept until the 20th century during the British Raj.

References

Types of administrative division
Government of Safavid Iran